Menán Du Plessis (born 1952) is a South African novelist and linguist.

Her debut novel A State of Fear won the 1985 Olive Schreiner Prize, and was a joint winner of the Sanlam Literary Prize in 1986.

Works
 A State of Fear. Cape Town: D. Philip, 1983. Republished by Pandora Press (1987).
 Longlive! Cape Town: D. Philip, 1989. Translated into German by Susanne Köhler as Das Lied der Gemeinschaft Roman.
 A unity hypothesis for the southern African Khoesan languages. PhD thesis, University of Cape Town, 2009.
 Kora: a lost Khoisan language of the early Cape and the Gariep. Pretoria: Unisa Press, 2018.

References

1952 births
Living people
South African novelists
Linguists from South Africa